Daniel Harlee Morgan (born 20 November 1990) is a New Zealand professional footballer who plays as a winger or left back for Peninsula Power.

References

Living people
1990 births
Association football midfielders
Auckland City FC players
Waitakere United players
Birkenhead United AFC players
Maritzburg United F.C. players

New Zealand Football Championship players
Association footballers from Auckland
New Zealand association footballers
New Zealand expatriate association footballers
Expatriate soccer players in South Africa